Salvia falcata is a perennial shrub that is endemic to a very small area in NW Cundinamarca in Colombia, growing in dry bushland in a steep river valley at around  elevation—unusually low for red-flowered salvias.

The inflorescence has single racemes in the leaf axils with a  red corolla.

Notes

falcata
Endemic flora of Colombia